In the 1975–76 season, MC Alger is competing in the National 1 for the 11th season, as well as the Algerian Cup. It is their 8th consecutive season in the top flight of Algerian football. They will be competing in National, the Algerian Cup and the African Cup of Champions. In 1976, MC Alger qualified for the African Cup of Champions Clubs for the first time in its history after winning the 1974–75 Algerian Championnat National. They reached the final after beating Al-Ahly Benghazi of Libya, Al Ahly of Egypt, Luo Union of Kenya and Enugu Rangers of Nigeria, respectively. In the final, they met Guinean club Hafia Conakry, who had won the last edition of the competition. In the first leg in Conakry, MC Alger lost 3–0 and faced the difficult task of having to score three goals in the return leg. However, in the return leg, they managed to score the three goals with a brace from Omar Betrouni and a goal from Zoubir Bachi. They went on to win the penalty shootout 4–1 to win their first African title and also become the first Algerian club to win a continental competition.

Squad list
Players and squad numbers last updated on 18 November 1975.Note: Flags indicate national team as has been defined under FIFA eligibility rules. Players may hold more than one non-FIFA nationality.

Pre-season and friendlies

Competitions

Overview

Championnat National

League table

Results by round

Matches

Algerian Cup

Maghreb Champions Cup

African Cup of Champions Clubs

Squad information

Appearances and goals

|-
! colspan=12 style=background:#dcdcdc; text-align:center| Goalkeepers

|-
! colspan=12 style=background:#dcdcdc; text-align:center| Defenders

|-
! colspan=12 style=background:#dcdcdc; text-align:center| Midfielders

|-
! colspan=12 style=background:#dcdcdc; text-align:center| Forwards

|-
! colspan=12 style=background:#dcdcdc; text-align:center| Players transferred out during the season

Goalscorers
Includes all competitive matches. The list is sorted alphabetically by surname when total goals are equal.

Notes

References

External links
 1975–76 MC Alger season at sebbar.kazeo.com 

MC Alger seasons